The Right Reverend Monsignor David Hogan is a Roman Catholic priest in the parish of St Bernadette in Nunthorpe in the Diocese of Middlesbrough, England. He is also a canon lawyer and a Knight of the Order of the Holy Sepulchre.

References

21st-century English Roman Catholic priests
Knights of the Holy Sepulchre
Living people
Year of birth missing (living people)
Place of birth missing (living people)